Child Museum may refer to:

Child Museum (Cairo)
London Children's Museum
Oman Children's Museum
Utah Child Museum
Children's Museum of Stockton, California